Thomas or Tom Cross may refer to:

 Thomas Cross (engraver), 17th-century English engraver and music publisher
 Tom Cross (film editor), American television and film editor
 Tom Cross (politician) (born 1958), Republican member of the Illinois House of Representatives
 Tom Cross (computer security) (born 1976), American computer security expert and hacker
 Tom Cross (rugby) (1876–1930), New Zealand dual-code rugby footballer
 Tom Cross (fencer) (born 1931), Australian Olympic fencer
 Tom Peete Cross (1879–1951), American Celticist

See also
 Tommy Cross (born 1989), ice hockey player